Rainbow Road is a level featured in the Mario Kart kart racing game series, developed and published by Nintendo. Presented as a rainbow-coloured racing course suspended in space, Rainbow Road is widely recognized as one of the most iconic elements of the Mario Kart series.

Characteristics
Rainbow Road customarily appears as the final original track of each game. It typically is among the most difficult to complete, since most of the Rainbow Road tracks have no rails to prevent the player from falling off the edges of the track during a turn, and oftentimes have tight curves, steep slopes, and wavy grounds. The Rainbow Roads of some Mario Kart editions have been revised to be featured more than once throughout the series.

Appearances
Rainbow Road appears as the final level of every major Mario Kart game since Super Mario Kart.

Mario Kart 8 / Mario Kart 8 Deluxe
In Mario Kart 8 for the Wii U as well as its 2017 revision Mario Kart 8 Deluxe for the Nintendo Switch, the track uses three laps again instead of sections, and there is again a planet in the background with a higher resolution than that from Mario Kart Wii. The ground uses quadratic tiles in resemblance to the track in Super Mario Kart. At the start/finish line, the track crosses through a space craft. Several more space carriers with parts of the track are present, most notably the one with two conveyor belt-like rotating rings in opposing directions which can speed up or slow down the vehicle when driven upon. As with other tracks from the game, the track surface is wildly twisted, and karts make use of the new anti-gravity feature. At a location, two separated parts of the track cross nearby in different angles, and distant parts of the track can be seen ahead from far away. According to Mario Kart 8 Deluxe producer Kosuke Yabuki, the development team's goal was to create a version of Rainbow Road with a "near-future" aesthetic when anti-gravity controls were added. The game also features three other iterations of Rainbow Road: the one from Mario Kart 64 (whose length is now only one lap divided into three sections), available with the base game; the one from Super Mario Kart, available via DLC in the original and part of the base game in Deluxe; and the one from Mario Kart 7, released for Deluxe as part of the Booster Course Pass.

Mario Kart Tour
Mario Kart Tour features two courses based on the original Rainbow Road from Super Mario Kart. Labelled as "remix courses" (abbreviated to "RMX courses") these courses use a different layout compared to the original, and feature new mechanics, such as gliding and bouncy mushroom platforms. These courses are named RMX Rainbow Road 1 and 2, and share their music with the course they are based on.

Cultural impact
Rainbow Road is referenced as a part of an Easter egg included in the programming of Tesla electric vehicles. According to Tesla CEO Elon Musk, once a Tesla car's autopilot mode is activated four times in quick succession, the gray road shown on the vehicle's instrument cluster would transform into a colorful path resembling Rainbow Road, with a cowbell tune playing in the background while this mode is turned on. In commemoration of Mario Day celebrations for March 10, 2021, Hot Wheels released a Mario Kart track set based on the course on June 24, 2021.

A rainbow road was created in tribute to the game and course in both iterations of Place, the communal pixel art collaboration created by Reddit for April Fools Day in 2017 and 2022.

To coincide with the 35th Anniversary of Super Mario Bros., an ice cream cake inspired by the track was released by Cold Stone Creamery from September 30 to December 15, 2020.

Reception
Rainbow Road has received a generally positive attention for its memorable music and unique visuals, as well as notoriety for its length and challenging difficulty. Edge Magazine described Rainbow Road as "the deadly ribbon that has entranced generations of racers". Gus Turner from Complex described Rainbow Road as "simultaneously the most thrilling and most devastating level in any Mario Kart title". Rainbow Road has appeared in multiple "top" ranking lists of the best tracks in the history of the Mario Kart franchise compiled by video game critics, including Paste Magazine, Digital Spy, Screen Rant, and GameRevolution, and TheGamer.

The Rainbow Road levels in certain Mario Kart games have received particular attention. BuzzFeed News Reporter Joseph Bernstein ranked the Super Mario Kart version of Rainbow Road #15 on his list of the "34 Video Game Levels That You Must Play Before You Die". Reminiscing the Super Mario Kart version of Rainbow Road, A. V. Club staff said the overall experience was awe-inspiring in spite of its flawed design and frustrating level of difficulty. Its music has been praised by GamesRadar Brett Elston  as well as Dan Neilan from The A.V. Club, who called it as the "one redeeming quality" of a notoriously difficult track. Andrew Webster from The Verge praised the updated version of Rainbow Road for Mario Kart 8 as the best example of its "impressive new track design" and called it a vast improvement when compared to previous instalments. On April 28, 2017, Rainbow Road was voted as the best course in Mario Kart 8 Deluxe by UK players.

Not all reception towards Rainbow Road has been positive. Ben Lee of Digital Spy as well as several US Gamer staff members consider Rainbow Road to be their least favorite tracks in the history of the Mario Kart franchise.

References

Fictional streets and roads
Mario Kart
Video game levels
Video game locations
Fictional elements introduced in 1992
Fictional astronomical locations